Harold Thomas Gregson (15 March 1919 – 8 January 1975), known professionally as John Gregson, was an English actor of stage, television and film, with 40 credited film roles. He was best known for his crime drama and comedy roles.

Gregson was credited in 40 films between 1948 and 1971, and on television from 1960 until his death. He was often cast as a police inspector or as a navy or army officer, or in comedy roles in Ealing and other British films.

Biography

Early life and military service
Born in Liverpool of Irish descent, Gregson grew up in the city's Wavertree area, where he was educated at Greenbank Road Primary School and later at St Francis Xavier's College, Liverpool. He left school at 16, working first for a telephone company, then for Liverpool Corporation, as the city council was then known, before the Second World War. During this time, Gregson became interested in amateur dramatics, joining first the local Catholic church theatre group at St Anthony's in Mossley Hill.

When war broke out, Gregson was called up and joined the Royal Navy as a sailor on minesweepers. At one point, his minesweeper was torpedoed and he was rescued from the sea with a knee injury.

Early post-war career
After being demobilised in 1945, Gregson joined the Liverpool Playhouse for a year, before going on to Perth Theatre in Scotland. There he met his future wife, actress Ida Reddish from Nottingham (at the time using the stage name Thea Kronberg, though she later became Thea Gregory) who had recently arrived from the Birmingham Repertory Theatre. They moved to London in 1947, and married in Hampstead. The couple eventually had three daughters and three sons. Gregson appeared alongside Alec Guinness in the play The Human Touch in the West End. He also starred in Roger MacDougall's comedy Macadam and Eve and later enjoyed success in Hugh Hastings's play Seagulls Over Sorrento at the Apollo Theatre.

One of Gregson's first screen appearances was in the film Saraband for Dead Lovers (1948), a tearjerking romance starring Joan Greenwood and Stewart Granger. In the popular Scott of the Antarctic (also 1948) he played Tom Crean.

Gregson could also be seen in Ealing's Whisky Galore! (1949) and Train of Events (1949), as well as The Hasty Heart (1949), Cairo Road (1950), Treasure Island (1950) and The Lavender Hill Mob (1951). He had a lead role in Angels One Five (1951), a war film.

He was promoted to leading man for The Brave Don't Cry (1952), about a mining disaster. Gregson had the second lead in Rank's Venetian Bird and supported in The Holly and the Ivy (both 1952). He also had a leading role in another Ealing comedy, The Titfield Thunderbolt (1953).

Stardom
Gregson became a star when cast in the comedy Genevieve (1953), also starring Kenneth More, Dinah Sheridan and Kay Kendall. It was the second-most popular film of the year in Britain. He was second-billed to Glynis Johns in a prison drama, The Weak and the Wicked (1954), another hit, and played the lead in a light drama, Conflict of Wings (1954). He was loaned to Adelphi Films for The Crowded Day (1954). He followed this with To Dorothy a Son (1954), a comedy co-starring Shelley Winters; and Three Cases of Murder (1955), an omnibus film co-starring Orson Welles.

Gregson had a big hit with a war film, Above Us the Waves (1956), playing an Australian, in support of John Mills. He did a comedy with Diana Dors, Value for Money, and a drama Jacqueline (both 1956). More successful was another war movie based on a true story, The Battle of the River Plate (1956) in which Gregson played F. S. Bell. This film helped British exhibitors vote him the eighth-biggest British film star in the country for 1956.

He followed it with True as a Turtle (1957), a comedy; and Miracle in Soho (1957), a drama. That year he was the fourth-biggest British star. The following year he was eighth, his last year in the top ten; his films included Rooney (1958), a comedy in which he played an Irish sportsman; Sea of Sand (1958), a war film; and The Captain's Table (1959) a comedy.

Gregson supported in SOS Pacific and Hand in Hand (both 1960), but was top-billed in Faces in the Dark (1960) and The Frightened City (1961). He had a support role in The Treasure of Monte Cristo (1961) and was one of many names in The Longest Day (1962). Gregson's final film roles of note were Live Now, Pay Later (1962) and Tomorrow at Ten (1962).

Later career
Gregson's film career faded after ten good years from 1952–1962. He was one of many leading men and women of the 1950s (the others including Kenneth More, Richard Todd, Patrick Holt, Michael Craig, Sylvia Syms and Muriel Pavlow) who struggled to maintain their status as leads beyond the early 1960s. From 1963 onwards, Gregson never played another leading film role.

Gregson also worked on TV. In Ivor Brown's BBC TV play William's Other Anne he played William Shakespeare revisiting his first girlfriend Anne Whateley. TV work became increasingly important to him from the mid-60s. He starred as Commander George Gideon in the 26 episodes of the series Gideon's Way (1964–66) (known as Gideon C.I.D. in America). He also appeared in The Saint with Roger Moore and a popular comedy adventure series with Shirley MacLaine, Shirley's World. He took over from Kenneth More in long-running TV adverts for coffee on British television. Gregson appeared in It's the Geography That Counts, the last play at the St James's Theatre before its closure in 1957.

Death
In January 1975, Gregson died suddenly from a heart attack near Porlock Weir, Somerset, aged 55, whilst on holiday, walking on the path to St. Beuno's Church, Culbone. He left a widow, Thea Gregory, and six children. 

Gregson's final television role was in the Southern Television serial Dangerous Knowledge, which was broadcast posthumously in 1976. His body was interred at Sunbury Cemetery, Sunbury-on-Thames, Surrey near his family home at Creek House, Chertsey Road, Shepperton. He left £42,628 and died intestate.

Complete filmography

London Belongs to Me (1948) - (uncredited)
Saraband for Dead Lovers (1948) - (uncredited)
Scott of the Antarctic (1948) - P.O. T. Crean R.N.
Whisky Galore! (1949) - Sammy MacCodrun
Train of Events (1949) - Malcolm Murray-Bruce (segment "The Composer")
The Hasty Heart (1949) - Raw recruit in jungle (uncredited)
Cairo Road (1950) - Coast Guardsman
Treasure Island (1950) - Redruth
The Lavender Hill Mob (1951) - Farrow
Angels One Five (1952) - Pilot Officer 'Septic' Baird
The Brave Don't Cry (1952) - John Cameron
Venetian Bird (1952) - Renzo Uccello
The Holly and the Ivy (1952) - David Paterson
The Titfield Thunderbolt (1953) - Gordon
Captain Brassbound's Conversion (1953 TV movie) - Captain Brassbound
Genevieve (1953) - Alan McKim
The Weak and the Wicked (1954) - Dr. Michael Hale
Conflict of Wings (1954) - Cpl. Bill Morris
The Crowded Day (1954) - Leslie
To Dorothy a Son (1954) - Tony Rapallo
Three Cases of Murder (1955) - Edgar Curtain ("You Killed Elizabeth" segment)
Above Us the Waves (1955) - Lt Alec Duffy
Value for Money (1955) - Chayley Broadbent
Jacqueline (1956) - Mike McNeil
The Battle of the River Plate (1956) - Captain Bell - H.M.S. Exeter
True as a Turtle (1957) - Tony Hudson
Miracle in Soho (1957) - Michael Morgan
Rooney (1958) - James Ignatius Rooney
Sea of Sand (1958) - Capt. Williams
The Captain's Table (1959) - Capt. Albert Ebbs
SOS Pacific (1959) - Jack Bennett
Hand in Hand (1960) - Father Timothy
Faces in the Dark (1960) - Richard Hammond
The Frightened City (1961) - Det. Insp. Sayers
The Treasure of Monte Cristo (1961) - Renato
The Longest Day (1962) - British Padre, Parachute Regiment - searching for his Communion Set
Live Now, Pay Later (1962) - Callendar
Tomorrow at Ten (1962) - Detective Chief Inspector Parnell
The Night of the Generals (1967) - Colonel Sandauer
Hans Brinker (1969 TV movie) - Mijnheer Brinker
Speaking of Murder (1971 TV movie) - Charles Ashton
Fright (1971) - Dr. Cordell

Box office rankings
For several years British exhibitors listed Gregson as one of the most popular local stars at the box office.
1956 – 9th most popular British star
1957 – 4th most popular British star (7th overall)
1958 – 8th

References

External links
 
 Website dedicated to the work of John Gregson
 Gregson images, Barnsley
 John Gregson at BFI

1919 births
1975 deaths
English male film actors
English male stage actors
English male television actors
Male actors from Liverpool
20th-century English male actors
British male comedy actors
English people of Irish descent
Royal Navy sailors
Royal Navy personnel of World War II
Shipwreck survivors